Rhamphexocoetus volans is an extinct bony fish that lived during the Lutetian epoch of Monte Bolca.  It combines features of both halfbeaks (i.e., its elongated lower jaw), and flying fishes (i.e., its elongated pectoral fins).

See also

 Prehistoric fish
 List of prehistoric bony fish

References

Eocene fish
Fossils of Italy
Fossil taxa described in 1985